Alphaea anopunctata is a moth of the family Erebidae. It was described by Charles Oberthür in 1896. It is found in China (Sichuan, Yunnan).

References

Moths described in 1896
Spilosomina
Moths of Asia